Aldine is a census-designated place (CDP) in unincorporated central Harris County, Texas, United States, located within the extraterritorial jurisdiction of Houston. The population was 15,999 at the 2020 census. The community is located on the Hardy Toll Road, Union Pacific Railroad, and Farm to Market Road 525. The Aldine area is near Houston's George Bush Intercontinental Airport, the second largest aviation facility in Texas.

History 
Aldine, built on the International–Great Northern Railroad, was named after a local farm family .  A post office operated in Aldine from 1896 to 1935; after 1935, mail was delivered from Houston. In 1914 Aldine included two general stores, a fig preserver, and several poultry breeders and several dairymen. The population briefly reached 100 in 1925. In the 1930s and 1940s the population decreased to between thirty and forty residents. The Aldine Independent School District was integrated by federal order in 1965. Aldine, with renewed population growth in the 1970s, had 12,623 residents in 1986 and 11,133 residents in 1990.

Over 60% of the houses in the Aldine area were damaged by Hurricane Harvey in 2017. In September 2018 the Houston Chronicle wrote that the people there were "still recovering".

Geography

Climate

Demographics

As of the census of 2000, there were 13,979 people, 4,007 households, and 3,193 families residing in the CDP. The population density was 1,727.0 people per square mile (667.2/km). There were 4,403 housing units at an average density of 543.9 per square mile (210.1/km). As of the 2020 United States census, there were 15,999 people, 4,309 households, and 3,436 families residing in the CDP.

In 2000, the racial and ethnic makeup of the CDP was 59.30% White, 5.84% African American, 0.69% Native American, 3.41% Asian, 0.07% Pacific Islander, 27.58% from other races, and 3.10% from two or more races. Hispanic or Latino of any race were 56.33% of the population. By 2020, the racial and ethnic makeup of the CDP was 87.41% Hispanic or Latino of any race, 8.05% non-Hispanic white, 2.17% Black or African American, 0.17% Native American, 1.31% Asian, 0.01% Pacific Islander, 0.23% some other race, and 0.66% multiracial.

Among the 4,007 households in 2000, 5.1% had children under the age of 18 living with them, 60.9% were married couples living together, 12.0% had a female householder with no husband present, and 20.3% were non-families. 16.5% of all households were made up of individuals, and 5.7% had someone living alone who was 65 years of age or older. The average household size was 3.44 and the average family size was 3.86. In the CDP, the population was spread out, with 33.1% under the age of 18, 11.4% from 18 to 24, 30.5% from 25 to 44, 17.6% from 45 to 64, and 7.3% who were 65 years of age or older. The median age was 28 years. For every 100 females, there were 107.7 males. For every 100 females age 18 and over, there were 106.4 males.

In 2000, the median income for a household in the CDP was $32,437, and the median income for a family was $35,518. Males had a median income of $28,779 versus $19,936 for females. The per capita income of the CDP was $11,701. About 17.0% of families and 18.6% of the population were below the poverty line, including 24.3% of those under age 18 and 19.3% of those age 65 or over. At the 2020 U.S. census, the median household income increased to $35,087 with a mean income of $49,382.

Parks and recreation

Harris County Precinct 1 operates Pep Mueller Park, located at 14750 Henry Road in Aldine. It was given its current name in 1981 to honor M. A. "Pep" Mueller, the superintendent of Precinct 4's Spring Camp, Road, and Bridge Maintenance Facility. The park has a playground, a community building, a basketball pavilion, a toilet and concession facility, four ball fields, and four press boxes.

Government and infrastructure

Local government

Areas within the Aldine CDP are served by Aldine Fire & Rescue. The Westfield Volunteer Fire Department serves some unincorporated areas outside of the Aldine CDP and in the Aldine area. Emergency medical services are provided by Harris County Emergency Corps.

In 1989, during a city council race, many in the Houston portion of the Aldine area voted for Jim Westmoreland for an at-large position. Westmoreland drew controversy after reports of a joke that was characterized as "racist" spread. His opponent Beverly Clark, an African-American teacher, defeated him in that race.

The portion of the Aldine area in the city of Houston is served by the Houston Police Department. Areas in the Houston city limits around the CDP are served by either the North Patrol Division, the North Belt Patrol Division, or the Northeast Patrol Division. In the North Division the city formerly operated the Aldine Storefront at 10966 North Freeway (Interstate 45).

County, state, and federal representation

Harris Health System (formerly Harris County Hospital District) operates the Aldine Health Center at 4755 Aldine Mail Route in unincorporated Harris County.

The Aldine CDP is served by Harris County Sheriff's Office District II Patrol, headquartered from the Humble Substation at 7900 Will Clayton Parkway in Humble. The Aldine Community Storefront is located at 5202 Aldine Mail Route.

Education

Primary and secondary schools

Public schools

Aldine Independent School District serves the CDP and much of the surrounding community.

PreK schools serving sections of Aldine CDP include deSantiago, Hinojosa (in Aldine CDP), and Lauder.

Elementary schools serving sections of Aldine CDP include Odom (in Aldine CDP), Reed (in Aldine CDP), Raymond (in Aldine CDP), Carroll, Eckert, and Bussey (in Houston). Eckert and Reed were previously grade 5-6 intermediate schools.

Middle schools serving Aldine CDP include Grantham (in Aldine CDP), Stovall (in Houston), and Aldine Middle (not in the CDP).

Aldine High School in Houston serves sections of Aldine CDP west of the Hardy Toll Road; sections east of the Hardy Toll Road are served by MacArthur High School and Nimitz High School, in unincorporated areas not in the CDP.

YES Prep North Central, a charter 6-12 grade public school, is located within unincorporated Harris County in the Aldine CDP.

Community colleges 
Lone Star College System (formerly the North Harris Montgomery Community College District) serves the area. In 1972 residents of Aldine ISD and two other K-12 school districts voted to create the North Harris County College. The community college district began operations in the fall of 1973.

Public libraries 

The Harris County Public Library Aldine Branch, located at 11331 Airline Drive in Greenspoint and in Houston, serves the community. The  branch opened in 1976. The renovated Aldine Branch reopened on September 6, 2001. The expansion and renovation was originally scheduled to be completed in January 2001. Due to the expansion, the library gained , which led to increases in meeting spaces and a 100% increase in the number of computers. Students from Aldine High School, Aldine 9th Grade School, Stovall Middle School, and Black Elementary School use the branch.

References

External links
 

Census-designated places in Harris County, Texas
Census-designated places in Texas